FC Continentals is a Canadian soccer club founded in 2008. The team is currently a member of the Canadian Soccer League, a non-FIFA sanctioned league. The club originally played under the name FC Vorkuta and was renamed FC Continentals in 2022. Their home venue is Centennial Park Stadium in Toronto, Ontario.

History 

The club was formed by Russian immigrants Igor Demitchev and Samad Kadirov in Toronto in 2008. The club derived its name from the main financier Demitchev's hometown Vorkuta in Russia. Initially the club operated at the amateur level in the Downtown Polson Pier Soccer League. In their debut season, Vorkuta achieved instant success after clinching both the regular and postseason titles. Within a year, the club transferred to the Thornhill Soccer Club League, and continued its uphill climb to success by winning the playoff title.

In 2010, the team remained in the York Region territory by joining the Richmond Hill Soccer League, and the Downsview Hangar Indoor Soccer League. In 2016, the organization decided to make the transition to the professional ranks by applying for membership in the Canadian Soccer League. After presenting a successful strategic business plan, the club received the necessary votes in order to be approved by the league ownership. In preparation for the 2017 CSL season, the team hired the services of Serhiy Zayets as head coach. Zayets assembled a roster with several key CSL veterans acquired primarily from FC Ukraine United. The acquisitions included Sergiy Ivliev, Oleg Shutov, Mykhailo Bulkin, Vitaliy Dnistryan, Danylo Lazar, Vadym Gostiev, and Oleh Kerchu was assigned the team captain. In addition to the CSL veterans, several imports were brought in from Ukraine and Russia to further strengthen the roster.

Vorkuta made their professional debut on May 27, 2017 against Milton SC with a 7–0 victory with goals coming from Kerchu, Lazar, Shutov, Gostiev, and Yaroslav Svorak. In the club's inaugural season at the professional level, Vorkuta managed to produce a significant result. By clinching the regular season title, and establishing the best offensive record with the second best defensive record. In the preliminary round of the postseason, they defeated Royal Toronto FC by a score of 6–3. Their 2017 campaign came to a conclusion in the following round after a 1–0 defeat to Scarborough SC.

In 2018, the club produced a notable season by securing the CSL Championship, and found further success in the Second Division as its reserve squad secured the double (division title and DII Championship). In 2022, the club was renamed FC Continentals.

Crest 

The club's first crest was in the shape of a circle with a soccer ball placed in the center along with the name of the club beneath it. The colors of the crest were blue, red, and white which represented the colors of the Canadian and the city of Toronto flags. On top of the crest was a barbed wire which symbolized the owner's birthplace Vorkuta in Siberia, Russia where a former Gulag labor camp was located.

In 2022, the name of the club was changed to FC Continentals which also resulted in a rebranding of the club's logo.

Players

Current squad

Head coaches 

 Serhiy Zayets (2017)
 Samad Kadirov (2018)
 Denys Yanchuk (2020)
 Andrei Malychenkov & Viktor Raskov (2021) 
 Andrei Malychenkov (2022–)

Honours
CSL Championship: 2018, 2020, 2022
CSL II Championship: 2018, 2019
Canadian Soccer League First Division/Regular Season:  2017, 2019, 2021
Canadian Soccer League Second Division: 2018, 2019 
ProSound Cup: 2021

Seasons

References

External links  
 FC Continentals (Official website)

 
Soccer clubs in Ontario
Canadian Soccer League (1998–present) teams
Soccer clubs in Toronto
Association football clubs established in 2008
2008 establishments in Ontario
Diaspora sports clubs
Russian diaspora
Ukrainian diaspora in Canada